Group 2 of the 1982 FIFA World Cup was one of six groups of national teams competing in the group stage of the 1982 FIFA World Cup. Play began on 14 June and ended on 23 June 1982. The group consisted of four teams: Seeded team, the European champions West Germany, World Cup debutants Algeria, Chile and Austria.

West Germany won the group and advanced to the second round, along with Austria. The final game in the group, between these two teams, was one of the most controversial in World Cup history: with both teams knowing a win by one or two goals for West Germany would result in both them and Austria qualifying at the expense of Algeria, after West Germany took the lead after 10 minutes, the remainder of the match was played without any serious attempts from either side to score. FIFA amended the rules for all future tournaments so that the final group fixtures are always played simultaneously to avoid a repeat of this situation. (However, this could possibly occur again at the upcoming 2026 FIFA World Cup, which will contain sixteen groups of three teams each, making it impossible for all the teams in a group to play simultaneously.)

Standings

Matches

West Germany vs Algeria

Chile vs Austria

West Germany vs Chile

Algeria vs Austria

Algeria vs Chile

West Germany vs Austria

References

External links
 1982 FIFA World Cup archive
 Spain 1982 FIFA Technical Report: Statistical Details of the Matches pp. 103-106

1982 FIFA World Cup
West Germany at the 1982 FIFA World Cup
Austria at the 1982 FIFA World Cup
Chile at the 1982 FIFA World Cup
Algeria at the 1982 FIFA World Cup